József Csermák (14 February 1932 – 14 January 2001 in Tapolca) was a Hungarian hammer thrower. He won the gold medal at the 1952 Summer Olympics with a throw of 60.34 m, setting a new world record and becoming the first athlete to break the 60 m barrier. At the next Olympics Csermák was chosen as the Olympic flag bearer for Hungary, but placed only fifth. He failed to reach the final at the 1960 Olympics. Besides his 1952 Olympic gold medal, Csermák won four Hungarian titles and a bronze medal at the 1954 European Championships.

References

External links

 
 
 

1932 births
2001 deaths
People from Senec, Slovakia
Sportspeople from the Bratislava Region
Hungarians in Slovakia
Hungarian male hammer throwers
Olympic athletes of Hungary
Athletes (track and field) at the 1952 Summer Olympics
Athletes (track and field) at the 1956 Summer Olympics
Athletes (track and field) at the 1960 Summer Olympics
Olympic gold medalists for Hungary
World record setters in athletics (track and field)
European Athletics Championships medalists
Medalists at the 1952 Summer Olympics
Olympic gold medalists in athletics (track and field)